Washington State International Kite Festival is the largest kite festival in North America. The event, held annually on the third weekend of August since 1996, drawing more than 100,000 attendees, is held on the Washington state coast near Long Beach, Washington where there is a steady, strong wind, strong enough at times to drag pickup trucks kites are tethered to, or lift a man 100 feet into the air. Events at the festival include kite fighting and lighted kite shows. It is hosted by the World Kite Museum in Long Beach.

The festival was cancelled in 2020 due to the COVID-19 pandemic.

References

External links

1996 establishments in Washington (state)
Festivals established in 1996
Festivals in Washington (state)
Kite festivals